The 2021–22 Orlando Magic season was the 33rd season of the franchise in the National Basketball Association (NBA). This was the first season since 2018 that Steve Clifford did not coach the Magic, after agreeing to part ways on June 5. On July 11, 2021  Jamahl Mosley was hired as the new head coach. On March 12, 2022, the Magic were eliminated from playoff contention, making it the second consecutive season that they did not make the playoffs.

Draft picks

In the 2021 NBA draft, the Magic selected Jalen Suggs from Gonzaga University with the fifth pick. The team also selected Franz Wagner from the University of Michigan with the eighth pick, and Jason Preston from Ohio University with the thirty-third pick. The draft rights to Preston was later traded to the Los Angeles Clippers.

Roster

Standings

Division

Conference

Game log

Preseason

|-style="background:#fcc;"
| 1
| October 4
| @ Boston
| 
| Anthony, Wagner (16)
| Mo Bamba (10)
| Cole Anthony (6)
| TD Garden19,156
| 0–1
|-style="background:#fcc;"
| 2
| October 6
| @ New Orleans
| 
| Wendell Carter Jr. (13)
| Wendell Carter Jr. (11)
| Anthony, Brazdeikis, Dowtin, Lopez, Suggs, F. Wagner, M. Wagner (2)
| Smoothie King Center12,407
| 0–2
|-style="background:#fcc;"
| 3
| October 10
| San Antonio
| 
| Terrence Ross (20)
| Mo Bamba (10)
| Cole Anthony (5)
| Amway Center12,509
| 0–3
|-style="background:#cfc;"
| 4
| October 13
| Boston
| 
| R. J. Hampton (20)
| Wendell Carter Jr. (9)
| Terrence Ross (5)
| Amway Center13,519
| 1–3

Regular season

|- style="background:#fcc;"
| 1
| October 20
| @ San Antonio
| 
| Mo Bamba (18)
| Wendell Carter Jr. (8)
| Anthony, Bamba (4)
| AT&T Center16,697
| 0–1
|- style="background:#fcc;"
| 2
| October 22
| New York
| 
| Franz Wagner (16)
| Mo Bamba (10)
| Jalen Suggs (8)
| Amway Center18,846
| 0–2
|- style="background:#cfc;"
| 3
| October 24
| @ New York
| 
| Cole Anthony (29)
| Cole Anthony (16)
| Cole Anthony (8)
| Madison Square Garden16,273
| 1–2
|- style="background:#fcc;"
| 4
| October 25
| @ Miami
| 
| F. Wagner, Suggs (15)
| Cole Anthony (9)
| Cole Anthony (5)
| FTX Arena19,600
| 1–3
|- style="background:#fcc;"
| 5
| October 27
| Charlotte
| 
| Cole Anthony (24)
| Bamba, Carter Jr. (10)
| Cole Anthony (6)
| Amway Center14,082
| 1–4
|- style="background:#fcc;"
| 6
| October 29
| @ Toronto
| 
| Cole Anthony (24)
| Mo Bamba (18)
| Anthony, Bamba (5)
| Scotiabank Arena19,800
| 1–5
|- style="background:#fcc;"
| 7
| October 30
| @ Detroit
| 
| F. Wagner (19)
| Cole Anthony (10)
| Jalen Suggs (6)
| Little Caesars Arena11,423
| 1–6

|- style="background:#cfc;"
| 8
| November 1
| @ Minnesota
| 
| Cole Anthony (31)
| Wendell Carter Jr. (14)
| Cole Anthony (8)
| Target Center14,744
| 2–6
|- style="background:#fcc;"
| 9
| November 3
| Boston
| 
| Anthony, Carter Jr. (13)
| Wendell Carter Jr. (13)
| Anthony, Carter Jr. (4)
| Amway Center12,735
| 2–7
|- style="background:#fcc;"
| 10
| November 5
| San Antonio
| 
| Cole Anthony (21)
| Wendell Carter Jr. (10)
| Cole Anthony (6)
| Amway Center14,101
| 2–8
|- style="background:#cfc;"
| 11
| November 7
| Utah
| 
| Cole Anthony (33)
| Wendell Carter Jr. (16)
| Wendell Carter Jr. (6)
| Amway Center13,386
| 3–8
|- style="background:#fcc;"
| 12
| November 10
| Brooklyn
| 
| Terrence Ross (17)
| Mo Bamba (9)
| Jalen Suggs (4)
| Amway Center13,882
| 3–9
|- style="background:#fcc;"
| 13
| November 13
| Washington
| 
| Cole Anthony (22)
| Mo Bamba (17)
| Cole Anthony (8)
| Amway Center17,272
| 3–10
|- style="background:#fcc;"
| 14
| November 15
| @ Atlanta
| 
| Cole Anthony (29)
| Wendell Carter Jr. (9)
| Cole Anthony (11)
| State Farm Arena13,061
| 3–11
|- style="background:#cfc;"
| 15
| November 17
| @ New York
| 
| Terrence Ross (19)
| Mo Bamba (12)
| Cole Anthony (7)
| Madison Square Garden16,680
| 4–11
|- style="background:#fcc;"
| 16
| November 19
| @ Brooklyn
|  
| Jalen Suggs (21)
| Mo Bamba (10)
| Cole Anthony (9)
| Barclays Center16,966
| 4–12
|- style="background:#fcc;"
| 17
| November 20
| @ Milwaukee
|  
| R. J. Hampton (19)
| Mo Bamba (7)
| R. J. Hampton (9)
| Fiserv Forum17,341
| 4–13
|- style="background:#fcc;"
| 18
| November 22
| @ Milwaukee
| 
| Moritz Wagner (18)
| Wendell Carter Jr. (10)
| R. J. Hampton (5)
| Fiserv Forum17,341
| 4–14
|- style="background:#fcc;"
| 19
| November 24
| Charlotte
| 
| Mo Bamba (18)
| Mo Bamba (12)
| Hampton, Suggs (6)
| Amway Center16,114
| 4–15
|- style="background:#fcc;"
| 20
| November 26
| Chicago
| 
| Wendell Carter Jr. (26)
| Wendell Carter Jr. (10)
| Harris, F. Wagner (4)
| Amway Center18,236
| 4–16
|- style="background:#fcc;"
| 21
| November 27
| @ Cleveland
| 
| Wendell Carter Jr. (19)
| Wendell Carter Jr. (11)
| Lopez, F. Wagner (4)
| Rocket Mortgage FieldHouse18,248
| 4–17
|- style="background:#fcc;"
| 22
| November 29
| @ Philadelphia
| 
| Franz Wagner (27)
| Mo Bamba (17)
| Suggs, F. Wagner (5)
| Wells Fargo Center20,193
| 4–18

|- style="background:#cfc;"
| 23
| December 1
| Denver
| 
| Cole Anthony (24)
| Anthony, Carter Jr. (8)
| Cole Anthony (7)
| Amway Center14,191
| 5–18
|- style="background:#fcc;"
| 24
| December 3
| @ Houston
| 
| Cole Anthony (26)
| Wendell Carter Jr. (16)
| Cole Anthony (7)
| Toyota Center13,697
| 5–19
|- style="background:#fcc;"
| 25
| December 6
| @ Golden State
| 
| Gary Harris (17)
| Wendell Carter Jr. (12)
| Franz Wagner (6)
| Chase Center18,064
| 5–20
|- style="background:#fcc;"
| 26
| December 8
| @ Sacramento
| 
| Cole Anthony (33)
| Wendell Carter Jr. (10)
| Cole Anthony (8)
| Golden 1 Center14,364
| 5–21
|- style="background:#fcc;"
| 27
| December 11
| @ L. A. Clippers
| 
| Cole Anthony (23)
| Wendell Carter Jr. (14)
| Wendell Carter Jr. (7)
| Staples Center17,156
| 5–22
|- style="background:#fcc;"
| 28
| December 12
| @ L. A. Lakers
| 
| Cole Anthony (21)
| Robin Lopez (9)
| Cole Anthony (5)
| Staples Center18,997
| 5–23
|- style="background:#fcc;"
| 29
| December 15
| Atlanta
| 
| Moritz Wagner (19)
| Wendell Carter Jr. (15)
| Terrence Ross (8)
| Amway Center13,576
| 5–24
|- style="background:#fcc;"
| 30
| December 17
| Miami
| 
| Franz Wagner (27)
| Chuma Okeke (10)
| Gary Harris (5)
| Amway Center14,103
| 5–25
|- style="background:#cfc;"
| 31
| December 18
| @ Brooklyn
| 
| Robin Lopez (20)
| Franz Wagner (11)
| Franz Wagner (6)
| Barclays Center16,292
| 6–25
|- style="background:#ccc;"
| —
| December 20
| @ Toronto
| colspan="6"|Postponed due to Magic players and staff members entering the NBA's Health and Safety Protocols. Makeup date: March 4.
|- style="background:#cfc;"
| 32
| December 22
| @ Atlanta
| 
| Franz Wagner (25)
| Freddie Gillespie (8)
| Robin Lopez (11)
| State Farm Arena15,299
| 7–25
|- style="background:#fcc;"
| 33
| December 23
| New Orleans
| 
| Anthony, Harris (22)
| Wendell Carter Jr. (12)
| Cole Anthony (11)
| Amway Center13,954
| 7–26
|- style="background:#fcc;"
| 34
| December 26
| @ Miami
| 
| Gary Harris (20)
| Wendell Carter Jr. (14)
| R. J. Hampton (5)
| FTX Arena19,600
| 7–27
|- style="background:#fcc;"
| 35
| December 28
| Milwaukee
| 
| Franz Wagner (38)
| Wendell Carter Jr. (10)
| Gravett, Hampton, Harris, Lopez (4)
| Amway Center16,696
| 7–28
|- style="background:#fcc;"
| 36
| December 30
| Milwaukee
| 
| Franz Wagner (20)
| Wendell Carter Jr. (10)
| Carter Jr., Frazier, Hampton (5)
| Amway Center15,855
| 7–29

|- style="background:#fcc;"
| 37
| January 2
| @ Boston
| 
| Terrence Ross (33)
| Wendell Carter Jr. (16)
| Wendell Carter Jr. (7)
| TD Garden19,156
| 7–30
|- style="background:#fcc;"
| 38
| January 3
| @ Chicago
| 
| Franz Wagner (22)
| Wendell Carter Jr. (10) 
| Wendell Carter Jr. (10) 
| United Center20,502
| 7–31
|- style="background:#fcc;"
| 39
| January 5
| Philadelphia
| 
| Cole Anthony (26)
| Wendell Carter Jr. (10)
| Cole Anthony (7)
| Amway Center13,116
| 7–32
|- style="background:#fcc;"
| 40
| January 8
| @ Detroit
| 
| Gary Harris (28)
| Chuma Okeke (10)
| Cole Anthony (6)
| Little Caesars Arena18,644
| 7–33
|- style="background:#fcc;"
| 41
| January 9
| Washington
| 
| Terrence Ross (32)
| Mo Bamba (9)
| Chuma Okeke (5)
| Amway Center13,223
| 7–34
|- style="background:#fcc;"
| 42
| January 12
| @ Washington
| 
| Cole Anthony (19)
| Anthony, Lopez (11)
| Franz Wagner (10)
| Capital One Arena13,138
| 7–35
|- style="background:#cfc;"
| 43
| January 14
| @ Charlotte
| 
| Moritz Wagner (26)
| Chuma Okeke (10)
| Cole Anthony (8)
| Spectrum Center16,011
| 8–35
|- style="background:#fcc;"
| 44
| January 15
| @ Dallas
| 
| Lopez, Suggs, M. Wagner (16)
| Bamba, Okeke (6)
| Anthony, F. Wagner (3)
| American Airlines Center19,816
| 8–36
|- style="background:#fcc;"
| 45
| January 17
| Portland
| 
| F. Wagner, M. Wagner (14)
| Anthony, Bamba (9)
| Cole Anthony (6)
| Amway Center13,648
| 8–37
|- style="background:#fcc;"
| 46
| January 19
| @ Philadelphia
| 
| Mo Bamba (32)
| Franz Wagner (11)
| Cole Anthony (8)
| Wells Fargo Center20,081
| 8–38
|- style="background:#fcc;"
| 47
| January 21
| L. A. Lakers
| 
| Jalen Suggs (22)
| Mo Bamba (8)
| Jalen Suggs (9)
| Amway Center18,846
| 8–39
|- style="background:#cfc;"
| 48
| January 23
| Chicago
| 
| Moritz Wagner (23)
| Carter Jr., Okeke (7)
| Jalen Suggs (7)
| Amway Center18,846
| 9–39
|- style="background:#fcc;"
| 49
| January 26
| L. A. Clippers
| 
| Franz Wagner (21)
| Wendell Carter Jr. (9)
| Cole Anthony (11)
| Amway Center12,448
| 9–40
|- style="background:#cfc;"
| 50
| January 28
| Detroit
| 
| Franz Wagner (24)
| Bamba, Carter Jr. (11)
| Cole Anthony (9)
| Amway Center13,156
| 10–40
|- style="background:#cfc;"
| 51
| January 30
| Dallas
| 
| Chuma Okeke (19)
| Wendell Carter Jr. (14)
| Cole Anthony (6)
| Amway Center13,376
| 11–40

|- style="background:#fcc;"
| 52
| February 1
| @ Chicago
| 
| Wendell Carter Jr. (24)
| Bamba, Carter Jr. (8)
| Cole Anthony (9)
| United Center20,217
| 11–41
|- style="background:#cfc;"
| 53
| February 2
| @ Indiana
| 
| Gary Harris (22)
| Wendell Carter Jr. (18)
| Anthony, Suggs (8)
| Bankers Life Fieldhouse14,528
| 12–41
|- style="background:#fcc;"
| 54
| February 5
| Memphis
| 
| Cole Anthony (22)
| Wendell Carter Jr. (10)
| Anthony, Suggs (5)
| Amway Center18,846
| 12–42
|- style="background:#fcc;"
| 55
| February 6
| Boston
| 
| Jalen Suggs (17)
| Mo Bamba (10)
| Jalen Suggs (5)
| Amway Center14,402
| 12–43
|- style="background:#cfc;"
| 56
| February 8
| @ Portland
| 
| Cole Anthony (23)
| Bamba, F. Wagner (9)
| Cole Anthony (9)
| Moda Center16,024
| 13–43
|- style="background:#fcc;"
| 57
| February 11
| @ Utah
| 
| Wendell Carter Jr. (22)
| Wendell Carter Jr. (9)
| Jalen Suggs (7)
| Vivint Arena18,306
| 13–44
|- style="background:#fcc;"
| 58
| February 12
| @ Phoenix
| 
| Jalen Suggs (20)
| Wendell Carter Jr. (11)
| Jalen Suggs (10)
| Footprint Center17,071
| 13–45
|- style="background:#fcc;"
| 59
| February 14
| @ Denver
| 
| Franz Wagner (26)
| Wendell Carter Jr. (12)
| Carter Jr., Okeke, F. Wagner (4)
| Ball Arena15,025
| 13–46
|- style="background:#fcc;"
| 60
| February 16
| Atlanta
| 
| Cole Anthony (23)
| Wendell Carter Jr. (10)
| Wendell Carter Jr. (6)
| Amway Center14,398
| 13–47
|- align="center"
|colspan="9" bgcolor="#bbcaff"|All-Star Break
|- style="background:#cfc;"
| 61
| February 25
| Houston
| 
| Wendell Carter Jr. (24)
| Wendell Carter Jr. (12)
| Cole Anthony (6)
| Amway Center16,631
| 14–47
|- style="background:#cfc;"
| 62
| February 28
| Indiana
| 
| Wendell Carter Jr. (21)
| Wendell Carter Jr. (12)
| Jalen Suggs (10)
| Amway Center13,014
| 15–47

|- style="background:#fcc;"
| 63
| March 2
| Indiana
| 
| Franz Wagner (28)
| Wendell Carter Jr. (18)
| Carter Jr., Suggs (5)
| Amway Center11,121
| 15–48
|- style="background:#cfc;"
| 64
| March 4
| @ Toronto
| 
| Anthony, Suggs (15)
| Cole Anthony (12)
| Jalen Suggs (7)
| Scotiabank Arena19,081
| 16–48
|- style="background:#fcc;"
| 65
| March 5
| @ Memphis
| 
| Cole Anthony (19)
| Moritz Wagner (11)
| Franz Wagner (6)
| FedExForum17,794
| 16–49
|- style="background:#fcc;"
| 66
| March 8
| Phoenix
| 
| Wendell Carter Jr. (20)
| Mo Bamba (15)
| Cole Anthony (5)
| Amway Center14,024
| 16–50
|- style="background:#cfc;"
| 67
| March 9
| @ New Orleans
| 
| Cole Anthony (19)
| Moritz Wagner (9)
| Anthony, Carter Jr. (5)
| Smoothie King Center15,633
| 17–50
|- style="background:#cfc;"
| 68
| March 11
| Minnesota
| 
| Mo Bamba (27)
| Mo Bamba (12)
| Markelle Fultz (7)
| Amway Center14,557
| 18–50
|- style="background:#fcc;"
| 69
| March 13
| Philadelphia
| 
| Wendell Carter Jr. (23)
| Wendell Carter Jr. (12)
| Markelle Fultz (11)
| Amway Center14,444
| 18–51
|- style="background:#fcc;"
| 70
| March 15
| Brooklyn
| 
| Cole Anthony (19)
| Moritz Wagner (11)
| Cole Anthony (7)
| Amway Center15,282
| 18–52
|- style="background:#fcc;"
| 71
| March 17
| Detroit
| 
| Franz Wagner (26)
| Mo Bamba (12)
| Cole Anthony (7)
| Amway Center14,369
| 18–53
|- style="background:#cfc;"
| 72
| March 20
| Oklahoma City
| 
| Wendell Carter Jr. (30)
| Wendell Carter Jr. (16)
| Cole Anthony (7)
| Amway Center15,012
| 19–53
|- style="background:#cfc;"
| 73
| March 22
| Golden State
| 
| Wendell Carter Jr. (19)
| Wendell Carter Jr. (8)
| Anthony, Hampton (5)
| Amway Center17,164
| 20–53
|- style="background:#fcc;"
| 74
| March 23
| @ Oklahoma City
| 
| Chuma Okeke (19)
| Mo Bamba (10)
| Cole Anthony (11)
| Paycom Center14,393
| 20–54
|- style="background:#fcc;"
| 75
| March 26
| Sacramento
| 
| Franz Wagner (19)
| Mo Bamba (13)
| Cole Anthony (9)
| Amway Center16,366
| 20–55
|- style="background:#fcc;"
| 76
| March 28
| @ Cleveland
| 
| Wendell Carter Jr. (15)
| Wendell Carter Jr. (12)
| Carter Jr., F. Wagner (6)
| Rocket Mortgage FieldHouse19,432
| 20–56
|- style="background:#fcc;"
| 77
| March 30
| @ Washington
| 
| Franz Wagner (28)
| Okeke, M. Wagner (8)
| Markelle Fultz (7)
| Capital One Arena16,455
| 20–57

|- style="background:#fcc;"
| 78
| April 1
| Toronto
| 
| Mo Bamba (15)
| Mo Bamba (10)
| Markelle Fultz (7)
| Amway Center17,566
| 20–58
|- style="background:#fcc;"
| 79
| April 3
| New York
| 
| Moritz Wagner (18)
| Mo Bamba (12)
| Markelle Fultz (6)
| Amway Center15,747
| 20–59
|- style="background:#cfc;"
| 80
| April 5
| Cleveland
| 
| Mo Bamba (21)
| Mo Bamba (12)
| R. J. Hampton (7)
| Amway Center16,897
| 21–59
|- style="background:#fcc;"
| 81
| April 7
| @ Charlotte
| 
| Chuma Okeke (20)
| R. J. Hampton (8)
| Markelle Fultz (6)
| Spectrum Center16,427
| 21–60
|- style="background:#cfc;"
| 82
| April 10
| Miami
| 
| Bamba, Hampton (21)
| Moritz Wagner (11)
| Markelle Fultz (15)
| Amway Center19,253
| 22–60

Transactions

Trades

Free agency

Additions

Subtractions

References

Orlando Magic seasons
Orlando Magic
Orlando Magic
Orlando Magic